Michael Rodenberg, nicknamed Miro (born 9 April 1970), is a German keyboard player and record producer known for working with power metal bands such as Angra, Shaaman, Luca Turilli, Rhapsody of Fire, Kamelot, and Heavens Gate. He mainly works in conjunction with his some-time bandmate Sascha Paeth.

In addition to his production work, Miro has made guest appearances for many of the bands he works with as a keyboard player, and also provides orchestral arrangements. He served a particularly long period as a guest of Kamelot, providing all keyboards on their studio albums from 1999 until 2005, when they hired tour musician Oliver Palotai as a full-time member.

In 2004, he participated in Aina, a metal opera featuring many guest heavy metal musicians.

In 2007, Miro and Sacha Paeth helped to relaunch Tobias Sammet's metal opera Avantasia, with the albums of The Wicked Trilogy (on which Miro played most of the keyboard parts and orchestrations), and also leading it to have a live band and play world tours.

Work

Production 

 1991 - Heavens Gate - "The Best Days of my Life" (Single)
1997 - Rhapsody - Legendary Tales (CD)
 1998 - Rhapsody - Symphony of Enchanted Lands (CD)
 1999 - Luca Turilli - King of the Nordic Twilight (CD)
 1999 - Kamelot - The Fourth Legacy (CD)
 2000 - Rhapsody - Dawn of Victory (CD)
 2000 - Rhapsody - Holy Thunderforce (CD5")
 2001 - Kamelot - Karma (CD)
 2001 - Rhapsody - Rain of a Thousand Flames (CD)
 2002 - Rhapsody - Power of the Dragonflame (CD)
 2002 - Luca Turilli - Prophet of the Last Eclipse (CD)
 2003 - Kamelot - Epica (CD)
 2004 - Rhapsody - Tales from the Emerald Sword Saga (CD)
 2004 - After Forever - Invisible Circles (CD)
 2005 - Kamelot - The Black Halo (CD)
 2005 - Epica - The Score – An Epic Journey (SACD)
 2007 - Kamelot - Ghost Opera (CD)
 2007 - Epica - The Divine Conspiracy (CD)
 2009 - Epica - Design Your Universe (CD)
 2010 - Kamelot - Poetry for the Poisoned (CD)
 2011 - Trillium - Alloy (CD)
 2012 - Epica - Requiem for the Indifferent (CD)

Appearance

Aina 
 2003 - Days of Rising Doom (CD/DVD)

Angra 
 2004 - Temple of Shadows (CD)

Avantasia 
 2007 -  Lost in Space Part I (EP)
 2007 - Lost in Space Part II (EP)
 2008 - The Scarecrow (CD)
 2010 - The Wicked Symphony (CD)
 2010 - Angel of Babylon (CD)
 2011 - The Flying Opera (CD/DVD)
 2013 - The Mystery of Time (CD)
 2016 - Ghostlights (CD)
2019 - Moonglow (CD)

Brainstorm 

 2000 - Ambiguity (CD)
 2001 - Metus Mortis (CD)
 2003 - Soul Temptation (CD)

Conception 
2018 - My Dark Symphony (EP)
2020 - State of Deception (CD)

Edguy 
2011 - Age of the Joker

Kamelot 
 1999 - The Fourth Legacy (CD)
 2001 - Karma (CD)
 2003 - Epica (CD)
 2005 - The Black Halo (CD)
 2007 - Ghost Opera (CD)
 2010 - Poetry for the Poisoned (CD)
 2012 - Silverthorn (CD)
 2015 - Haven (CD)
 2018 - The Shadow Theory (CD)
 2023 - The Awakening (CD)

Rhapsody of Fire 
 1997 - Legendary Tales (Choir and producer)
 1999 - Symphony of Enchanted Lands (Choir and producer)
 2000 - Dawn of Victory (Epic choir and producer)
 2002 - Power of the Dragonflame (Epic Choir and producer)

Luca Turilli 
 1999 - King of the Nordic Twilight (CD)
 2002 - Prophet of the Last Eclipse (CD)

Shaaman 
 2002 - Ritual
 2005 - Reason (CD)

Thalion 
 2004 - Another Sun (CD)

References

External links 
 Biography
 Encyclopedia Metallum Miro (Michael Rodenberg)

German heavy metal musicians
German keyboardists
Heavy metal keyboardists
Living people
1970 births
People from Wolfsburg
Luca Turilli (band) members